Cyperus cyperinus is a species of sedge that is native to parts of Asia and Oceania.

See also 
 List of Cyperus species

References 

cyperinus
Plants described in 1898
Flora of Queensland
Flora of Borneo
Flora of Bangladesh
Flora of China
Flora of Christmas Island
Flora of Fiji
Flora of Hawaii
Flora of Java
Flora of India
Flora of Malaysia
Flora of the Mariana Islands
Flora of the Cocos (Keeling) Islands
Flora of the Cook Islands
Flora of Myanmar
Flora of Nepal
Flora of New Caledonia
Flora of New Guinea
Flora of the Nicobar Islands
Flora of the Philippines
Flora of Samoa
Flora of Seychelles
Flora of Sri Lanka
Flora of Sulawesi
Flora of Sumatra
Flora of Taiwan
Flora of Thailand
Flora of Tibet
Flora of Tonga
Flora of Vanuatu
Flora of Vietnam
Flora of Yemen